Mason Summers Peters (September 3, 1844 – February 14, 1914) was a U.S. Representative from Kansas.

Early life
Marcus Summers Peters was born on September 3, 1844, in Clay County, Missouri near Kearney. He attended the William Jewell College, Liberty, Missouri.

Career
Peters taught in the grammar schools of Clay County, Missouri from 1867 to 1870. He served as clerk of the court of Clinton County, Missouri from 1870 to 1874. He studied law and was admitted to the bar in 1875 and commenced practice in Plattsburg, Missouri. He moved to Wyandotte County, Kansas, in 1886. He organized the Union Live Stock Commission Co. in 1895.

Peters was elected as a Populist to the Fifty-fifth Congress (March 4, 1897 – March 3, 1899). He was unsuccessful for reelection in 1898 to the Fifty-sixth Congress. He resumed his business and professional pursuits in Kansas City, Kansas.

Personal life
Peters died on February 14, 1914,  in Kansas City, Missouri. He was interred at Forest Hill Calvary Cemetery in Kansas City.

References

1844 births
1914 deaths
People from Kearney, Missouri
Kansas Populists
People's Party members of the United States House of Representatives from Kansas
Politicians from Kansas City, Kansas
19th-century American politicians
People from Plattsburg, Missouri
Members of the United States House of Representatives from Kansas